Dzwe (Ꚃ ꚃ; italics: Ꚃ ꚃ) is a letter of the Cyrillic script. It resembles an intact longer Cyrillic Dze (Ѕ ѕ Ѕ ѕ), but perhaps was derived from the Greek letter ζ.

Dzwe was used in the Abkhaz language where it represented the labialized voiced alveolo-palatal affricate . This was replaced by the digraph Ӡә.

Computing codes

See also 
Ӡ ӡ : Cyrillic letter Abkhazian Dze
Ѕ ѕ : Cyrillic letter Dze (Macedonian Dze)
S s : Latin letter S
ſ : Long S
Ꞅ ꞅ : Latin letter Insular S
Cyrillic characters in Unicode

Cyrillic letters